Rosewood is an American police procedural drama series that aired on Fox from September 23, 2015, to April 28, 2017. The series was created by Todd Harthan, starring Morris Chestnut as Dr. Beaumont Rosewood Jr., a private pathologist working in Miami, Florida, in high demand with law enforcement. On October 16, 2015, Fox picked up Rosewood for a full season of 22 episodes.
On April 7, 2016, Fox renewed the series for a second season which premiered on September 22, 2016.

On May 9, 2017, Fox cancelled the series after two seasons.

Cast and characters

Main
 Morris Chestnut as Dr. Beaumont Darius Rosewood, Jr.
 Jaina Lee Ortiz as Det. Annalise Villa
 Gabrielle Dennis as Pippy Rosewood, Beaumont's sister
 Anna Konkle as Tara Milly Izikoff (TMI), Pippy's girlfriend/wife
 Domenick Lombardozzi as Captain/Detective Ira Hornstock
 Lorraine Toussaint as Donna Rosewood, Beaumont's mother
Sam Huntington as Dr. Mitchie Mendelson (season 2; recurring, season 1)
Eddie Cibrian as Captain Ryan Slade (season 2) 
 Kamal Angelo Bolden as Ju-Ju

Recurring
Letoya Luckett as Tawnya
Nicole Ari Parker as Dr. Kat Crawford
Taye Diggs as Dr. Mike Boyce
Rayna Tharani as Felicia
Lisa Vidal as Daisy Villa
Joy Bryant as Dr. Erica Kincaid
Tia Mowry-Hardrict as Cassie
Alysia Reiner as Lilian Izikoff
Sherri Shepherd as Dr. Anita Eubanks
Manny Montana as Marcos Villa
Eric Winter as Dr. Adrian Webb

Guest
Sam Witwer as Heath Casablanca
Mackenzie Astin as Dr. Max Cahn
Adrian Pasdar as Dr. Derek Foster
Vondie Curtis Hall as Dr. Beaumont Rosewood Sr.
Michael Irby as Agent Giordano
Ryan W. Garcia as IAD Agent Malcute
Adam Butterfield as Bobby Gabootz
Katharine Isabelle as Naomi
Carla Gallo as Daisy Wick (reprising her role from Bones)

Series overview

Episodes

Season 1 (2015–16)

Season 2 (2016–17)

Reception
Rosewood has been met with generally negative reviews from critics, despite its good ratings on Fox. On Rotten Tomatoes, season 1 has a rating of 9%, based on 112 reviews, with an average rating of 3.6/10. Metacritic gave season one of the shows a score of 37 out of 100, based on 23 reviews, signifying "generally unfavorable reviews".

Ratings

Season 1 (2015–16)

Season 2 (2016–17)

Home media

See also

References

External links

2015 American television series debuts
2017 American television series endings
2010s American crime drama television series
2010s American LGBT-related drama television series
2010s American medical television series
2010s American mystery television series
English-language television shows
Fictional portrayals of the Miami-Dade Police Department
Lesbian-related television shows
Television shows set in Miami
Television series by 20th Century Fox Television
Fox Broadcasting Company original programming
Television shows featuring audio description